The year 1912 in radio involved some significant events.

Events
 15 April – Sinking of the RMS Titanic: CQD and SOS radio distress signals are sent.
 5 July – International Radiotelegraph Convention signed in London.
 13 August – The United States Congress passes the Radio Act of 1912, "An Act to regulate radio communication", requiring that all radio stations be licensed.
 9YV, an experimental station operated by Kansas State University in Manhattan, Kansas, becomes the first radio station in the United States to offer a regularly-scheduled daily broadcast (in morse code) of the weather forecast.

Births
16 February – Del Sharbutt, American radio and television announcer (died 2002)
8 April – Mary Dee, born Mary Goode, African American DJ (died 1964)
24 June – Brian Johnston, English cricket commentator and radio presenter (died 1994)
1 July – Wallace Greenslade, English radio announcer (died 1961)
5 October – Tony Marvin, American radio and television announcer (died 1998)
26 November – Eric Sevareid, American radio news reporter (died 1992)
Rita Zucca, Italian American Axis propaganda broadcaster (died 1998)

References

 
Radio by year